The women's hammer throw at the 2022 European Athletics Championships took place at the Olympiastadion on 16 and 17 August.

Records

Schedule

Results

Qualification

Qualification: 72.50 m (Q) or best 12 performers (q)

Final

References

Hammer Throw
Hammer throw at the European Athletics Championships
Euro